Angelica Gogos (born 3 September 1989) is a retired Australian rules footballer who played for the Western Bulldogs in the AFL Women's competition. Gogos was recruited by the Western Bulldogs as a free agent in November 2016. She made her debut in the thirty-two point win against  at VU Whitten Oval in the opening round of the 2017 season. In 2017 she was also a member of the Bulldogs premiership side.  She played every match in her debut season to finish with seven matches overall. Gogos announced her retirement from the AFLW on 16 June 2021, citing continual injuries as the main cause.

Statistics
Statistics are correct to the end of the 2021 season.

|- style=background:#EAEAEA
| scope=row | 2017 ||  || 36
| 7 || 1 || 2 || 26 || 27 || 53 || 1 || 43 || 0.1 || 0.3 || 3.7 || 3.9 || 7.6 || 0.1 || 6.1 || 0
|-
| scope=row bgcolor=F0E68C | 2018# ||  || 36
| 8 || 0 || 0 || 34 || 44 || 78 || 7 || 50 || 0.0 || 0.0 || 4.3 || 5.5 || 9.8 || 0.9 || 6.3 || 0
|- style=background:#EAEAEA
| scope=row | 2019 ||  || 36
| 7 || 0 || 0 || 39 || 14 || 53 || 2 || 42 || 0.0 || 0.0 || 5.6 || 2.0 || 7.6 || 0.3 || 6.0 || 0
|-
| scope=row | 2020 ||  || 36
| 3 || 0 || 0 || 15 || 9 || 24 || 4 || 10 || 0.0 || 0.0 || 5.0 || 3.0 || 8.0 || 1.3 || 3.3 || 0
|- style=background:#EAEAEA
| scope=row | 2021 ||  || 36
| 3 || 0 || 0 || 23 || 0 || 23 || 7 || 9 || 0.0 || 0.0 || 7.7 || 0.0 || 7.7 || 2.3 || 3.0 || 0
|- class=sortbottom
! colspan=3 | Career
! 28 !! 1 !! 2 !! 137 !! 94 !! 231 !! 21 !! 154 !! 0.1 !! 0.1 !! 4.9 !! 3.4 !! 8.3 !! 0.8 !! 5.5 !! 0
|}

References

External links 

1989 births
Living people
Western Bulldogs (AFLW) players
Australian rules footballers from Victoria (Australia)
Melbourne University Football Club (VFLW) players